Euryomyrtus ramosissima, the rosy baeckea, is a shrub in the myrtle family (Myrtaceae). The species is endemic to Australia. It is spreading in habit and grows to 60 cm in height. Its leaves are dark green, long and narrow ranging from 3 to 13 mm in length and 1 to 3 mm in width. White, pink or mauve flowers with circular petals are produced between June and February in its native range.

Taxonomy
Two subspecies are currently recognised:

E. ramosissima subsp. prostrata (Hook.f.) Trudgen (Synonyms: Baeckea prostrata Hook.f., Euryomyrtus parviflora Miq., Baeckea ramosissima subsp. prostrata (Hook.f.) G.W.Carr
E. ramosissima (A.Cunn.) Trudgen subsp. ramosissima (syn. Baeckea ramosissima).

Distribution
The species occurs in New South Wales, Victoria, Tasmania and South Australia.

Cultivation
The species performs best in a sunny or partially shaded, well-drained position. Plants may be propagated from semi-mature cuttings or seed, though the latter is not readily available

References

  

Flora of New South Wales
Flora of South Australia
Flora of Tasmania
Flora of Victoria (Australia)
ramosissima
Taxa named by Allan Cunningham (botanist)